Leon Lalite previously known as Leon Bell (born 19 December 1980 in Hitchin) is an English professional footballer who last played as a midfielder for Grays Athletic in the Isthmian League.

External links
 

1980 births
Living people
Sportspeople from Hitchin
English footballers
Association football defenders
Barnet F.C. players
Stevenage F.C. players
Boreham Wood F.C. players
Bristol Rovers F.C. players
Cambridge City F.C. players
Waltham Forest F.C. players
Harlow Town F.C. players
Thurrock F.C. players
Grays Athletic F.C. players
English Football League players
National League (English football) players
Isthmian League players
Association football midfielders